Massachusetts Senate's 2nd Suffolk and Middlesex district in the United States is one of 40 legislative districts of the Massachusetts Senate. It covers 3.8% of Middlesex County and 15.9% of Suffolk County population in 2010. Democrat Will Brownsberger of Belmont has represented the district since 2012.

Locales represented
The district includes the following localities:
 Belmont
 parts of Boston
 Watertown

Senators 
 Steven Tolman, circa 2002 
 Will Brownsberger, 2012-present

See also
 List of Massachusetts Senate elections
 List of Massachusetts General Courts
 List of former districts of the Massachusetts Senate
 Middlesex County districts of the Massachusetts House of Representatives: 1st, 2nd, 3rd, 4th, 5th, 6th, 7th, 8th, 9th, 10th, 11th, 12th, 13th, 14th, 15th, 16th, 17th, 18th, 19th, 20th, 21st, 22nd, 23rd, 24th, 25th, 26th, 27th, 28th, 29th, 30th, 31st, 32nd, 33rd, 34th, 35th, 36th, 37th
 Suffolk County districts of the Massachusetts House of Representatives: 1st, 2nd, 3rd, 4th, 5th, 6th, 7th, 8th, 9th, 10th, 11th, 12th, 13th, 14th, 15th, 16th, 17th, 18th, 19th

References

External links
 Ballotpedia
  (State Senate district information based on U.S. Census Bureau's American Community Survey).
 
 League of Women Voters of Boston

Senate 
Government of Middlesex County, Massachusetts
Government of Suffolk County, Massachusetts
Massachusetts Senate